Franz Plangger (born 2 October 1966) is an Austrian luger and skeleton racer who competed from the late 1980s to the early 2000s.

As a skeleton athlete, he won four medals in the men's event at the FIBT World Championships with two silvers (1993, 1996), and two bronzes (1989, 1994).

Plangger won the men's Skeleton World Cup title in 1992–3.

He also won six World Cup victories in luge between 1993 and 1995.

References
List of men's skeleton World Cup champions since 1987.
Lugesport.com profile
Men's skeleton world championship medalists since 1989

1966 births
Living people
Austrian male lugers
Austrian male skeleton racers